Bautista Andrés Pavlovsky (born 16 December 1997) is an Argentine professional footballer who plays as a forward for Botoșani II.

Career
Pavlovsky's career started with Argentinos Juniors. In July 2018, Pavlovsky was loaned by Primera B Nacional side Chacarita Juniors. Initially an unused substitute for a game against Santamarina in November, Pavlovsky made his professional bow on 2 March 2019 during a 3–0 loss away to Brown. A total of four appearances arrived for the forward at Chacarita. In mid-2019, Pavlovsky headed to Romania with Botoșani II of Liga III.

Career statistics
.

References

External links

1997 births
Living people
Footballers from Buenos Aires
Argentine footballers
Association football forwards
Argentine expatriate footballers
Expatriate footballers in Romania
Argentine expatriate sportspeople in Romania
Primera Nacional players
Argentinos Juniors footballers
Chacarita Juniors footballers